Shahin Badar (born 17 June 1974) is an English singer-songwriter who is best known in Europe and North America for her vocals on The Prodigy's single "Smack My Bitch Up" (1997). It earned her a Double Platinum award.

Early life
Badar was born in Colchester, Essex, England to a Bangladeshi father and Indian mother. She spent her formative years growing up in Kuwait and United Arab Emirates.

Inspired by her mother, Zohra Ahmed, who is a classical singer and encouraged by her teachers, Badar developed a blend of Arabic and Indian vocals. She sings in English, Arabic, Bengali and Indian languages.

Badar returned to England to continue her schooling at Gilbert Grammar School. Upon leaving she took up a position in Customs and Excise.

Career

Recording
In 1996, Badar's first album Destiny was released, produced by British music producer Kuljit Bhamra. In 2010, her second album Laila was released.

Badar's vocal contributions feature in over 50 international film and TV soundtracks. Her vocals have also featured on shows such as the UK Music Hall of Fame, Bollywood films Yuva and Zubeidaa, the theatrical trailer for Lara Croft Tomb Raider: The Cradle of Life, Charlie's Angels, Scary Movie 2, Dhai Akshar Prem Ke, Closer, US sitcoms North Shore and Kevin Hill, and Sky News broadcasts.

She has worked with musicians and producers such as A. R. Rahman, Liam Howlett, Tim Deluxe, Fraser T Smith, Indian Ropeman, Jah Wobble, Twista, Juliette Lewis, Bobina. She supported 50 Cent and worked with director Ang Lee on the film The Hulk.

Several of Badar's collaborations have charted in the UK Charts top ten singles, Independent, Dance, Radio and Bhangra charts with inclusions on three The Prodigy UK No.1 albums: The Fat of the Land, Always Outnumbered Never Outgunned, and Their Law: The Singles 1990-2005. Her most notable hit is "Smack My Bitch Up", released in 1997, in 2013, she received a quadruple platinum disc for her contributions.

Her vocal and written work has featured in adverts for Scottish Widows, Tongues on Fire and Zee Cine Awards.

She has also appeared as a judge for Brit Asia Talent show and one of the judges for Miss Universe Great Britain.

Performances
Badar has headlined various UK festivals, performed live with 50 Cent, and has performed in countries such as Switzerland, Singapore, Sweden, France, Belgium, Norway, Russia, Ireland, India, and at events such as Radio One Live, Creamfields, Oxegen, Glastonbury Festival, Ibiza Rocks, Global Gathering, World of Music, Arts and Dance (WOMAD), Respect Festival, Essentials Festival, and Mystery Land in the Netherlands.

She was the face of the Bradford International Festival in 2002 and headlined the Luton International Carnival in 2000.

Achievements
Badar has received recognition of her work from various awarding bodies through short-listings and nominations, in addition to this her performance and written work is also included in projects that have secured major awards(*).

1996
 "Jind Meriyeh": UK Bhangra Chart No. 4 

1997
 The Prodigy's album The Fat of the Land: UK Albums Chart No. 1 and a Double Platinum award. Featuring Badar's vocals on "Smack My Bitch Up", Badar received a copy of the award for her contribution to the album.

2005
 Mukhtar Sahota's album 4 The Muzik: UK Bhangra Chart No. 3. Featuring Badar's vocal performance on "Gal Lagja"

2004
 BBC Radio 1 Pete Tong: Essential Selection Tune of the Week – "Mundaya"
 BBC Asian Network: Tune of the Week – "Queen of OPunjab"
 BBC Asian Network: Tune of The Week – "Yeh Rog"
 "Mundaya": Dance Chart top 10

Awards and nominations

Discography

Singles

Albums

Collaborations

See also
British Bangladeshi
List of British Bangladeshis

References

External links

Shahin Badar on BritBangla
Exclusive Shahin Badar interview. . DESIblitz. 30 July 2009
McConnell, Jane. Shahin Badar. Manchester GossipShahin Badar Interview. Female First. 4 May 2010
Kabir, Punny. In conversation with Shahin Badar. Dhaka Tribune''. 27 October 2014

1974 births
Living people
English Muslims
English people of Bangladeshi descent
English people of Indian descent
Arabic-language singers
Bengali-language singers
English women singer-songwriters
Singers from London
People from Colchester
People from Gants Hill
21st-century English women singers
21st-century English singers